Umesh Karunaratne (born 19 January 1989) is a Sri Lankan first-class cricketer. He was part of Sri Lanka's squad for the 2008 Under-19 Cricket World Cup.

See also
 List of Chilaw Marians Cricket Club players

References

External links
 

1989 births
Living people
Sri Lankan cricketers
Bloomfield Cricket and Athletic Club cricketers
Chilaw Marians Cricket Club cricketers
People from Sri Jayawardenepura Kotte